Robin Anthony Ayres (born 5 May 1961) is a British sprint canoeist who competed in the late 1980s. He was eliminated in the repechages of the K-4 1000 m event at the 1988 Summer Olympics in Seoul.

References
Sports-reference.com profile

1961 births
Canoeists at the 1988 Summer Olympics
Living people
Olympic canoeists of Great Britain
British male canoeists